Faig Balagha oghlu Aghayev (29 December 1971) is an Azerbaijani pop singer and is the winner of the People's Artist of Azerbaijan award (2008).

Career
Aghayev made his on stage debut in "Bakı Payızı 1988" ("Baku Autumn 1988") musical contest where he won the first place.

During his time at university he gained recognition as a singer, winning multiple musical contests, including "Qızıl payız 1989" ("Golden Autumn 1989") contest, "Vitebsk 1990" international contest and "Yalta 1992" international television song contest.

After graduating from the Azerbaijan State University of Culture and Art in 1993, he continued participating in contests and was placed first in "Kharkov 1995" and "Golden Hit."

In 1995, his first album "Ola bilməz" ("It can't be") was produced. This was the first in a series of albums, such as "Səni əvəz eləmir" ("None can replace you") in 1996, "Vəfasızım" ("My faithless") in 1998, "Faiq Ağayev – Seçmələr" ("The best of Faig Aghayev") in 1999, "Minilliyin sonu" ("The end of Millennium") in 2000, in 2004 "Tam məxfi" ("Top secret") and in 2006 "Faiq Ağayev - Albom Kolleksiyası" ("Album Collection").

Since 1996, Aghayev has been the soloist of Azerbaijan State Television and Radio Company (AzTV). During the 2012–2013 years he was also the soloist of the Azerbaijan State Mugham Theatre.

In 2013, 2015 and 2018, Aghayev was a member of Azerbaijan's national jury at the Eurovision Song Contest. He was the spokesperson for the presentation of points for Azerbaijan at the Eurovision Song Contest in 2019.

He was also the coach on "The Voice - Azerbaijan" contest in 2015.

Awards 
In 1998 Aghayev won the Concert of the Year Humay National Music Award.

In 1999 Aghayev won Music Video of the Year Humay award for "Dəşti" ("Dashtee") music video as well as the Grand award for Singer of the year.

On 28 October 2000, by the decree of Heydar Aliyev, the President of Azerbaijan, Aghayev was awarded with the honorary title of Honored Artist of Azerbaijan. He was also the winner of Qızıl Mikrofon ("Golden Microphone") National Music Award for Singer of the year.

In 2001, he was the winner of Grand National Musical Award in 3 nominations including Singer of the year, Concert of the year ("Əsrin ve minilliyin son konserti" - "The last concert of the century and the millennium") and Album of the year ("Minilliyin sonu" - "The end of the millennium").

On 17 September 2008, Ilham Aliyev, the President of Azerbaijan, awarded Aghayev with the honorary title of People's Artist of Azerbaijan.

Personal life 
In April 2019 Faig Aghayev was appointed a member of arts council of Azad Azerbaijan TV channel.

Discography

References 

1971 births
Living people
21st-century Azerbaijani male singers
Musicians from Baku
People's Artists of Azerbaijan
Soviet Azerbaijani people
English-language singers from Azerbaijan
Azerbaijani pop singers